The Panther or The Panthers may refer to:

The Panther!, a 1970 album by the saxophonist Dexter Gordon
The Panther (horse), a British race horse (1916–1931)
The Panthers (miniseries), a 2021 miniseries about the origins of the Polynesian Panthers in New Zealand
The Panther (novel), a 2012 novel by Nelson DeMille
"The Panther" (poem), one of the best known poems of the writer Rainer Maria Rilke (1875–1926)
The Panther (wrestler), a wrestler also known as Cachorro
The Panther (Sam Brushell), an Indian who lived in Otsego County, New York in the 1800s
The Panthers FC, football club in Malabo, Equatorial Guinea

See also
 Panther (disambiguation)
 Black Panther (disambiguation)
 The Pink Panther (disambiguation)